Ngaji River is a river in the northern part of Nigeria. Originating in the wetland areas of Gadaka town in Yobe State, it runs some 40 kilometres south to Ngalda and where it joins with the Ngalda River about 22.2 kilometres south of Fika town.

See also
 Yobe River

References

Rivers of Nigeria